Charles Frederick Allen (January 28, 1816 – February 9, 1899) was an American Methodist theologian and university president from Maine. In 1872, he earned a Doctorate of Divinity from Bowdoin College and Wesleyan University. He was the first president of Maine State College (1871–78). During his time as President, the college's enrollment increased from 17 to 102. He left the institution in 1878 in order to return to the ministry. He served as a Presiding Elder for three years.

References

1816 births
1899 deaths
People from Norridgewock, Maine
American Methodist clergy
Presidents of the University of Maine
Methodist theologians
19th-century American clergy